The 1978 Duke Blue Devils football team represented the Duke Blue Devils of Duke University during the 1978 NCAA Division I-A football season.

Schedule

Roster

References

Duke
Duke Blue Devils football seasons
Duke Blue Devils football